Chehel Chay Rural District is a rural district (dehestan) in the Central District of Minudasht County, Golestan Province, Iran. At the 2006 census, its population was 23,978, in 6,003 families.  The rural district has 37 villages.

References 

Rural Districts of Golestan Province
Minudasht County